Zoop in South America is a 2007 Dutch youth film. The film received a Golden Film for 100,000 visitors.

External links

2007 films
2000s adventure comedy films
2000s children's comedy films
Dutch adventure comedy films
Dutch children's films
2000s Dutch-language films
Films set in South America
Films based on television series
Dutch sequel films
2007 comedy films
Films directed by Johan Nijenhuis